The Daewoo Precision Industries K5 or K5/DP51 series is a 9×19mm semi-automatic pistol produced by S&T Daewoo of South Korea.

The K5 was introduced in 1989. It is recoil operated and uses a conventional Browning-type locking system. It is mostly carried by commissioned officers in the South Korean military.

Design
The K5 is a compact, lightweight pistol with an unconventional trigger mechanism called "fast action". The frame is made of forged 7075-T6 aluminum alloy with a matte anodized finish, while the slide is constructed out of forged 4140 steel with a matte finish.

The pistol features an unusual "fast action" trigger mechanism which allows the hammer to be decocked while still keeping the mainspring compressed. The "fast action" (also known as Triple Action, and most recently known as Double Action Plus+) mode allows the trigger travel of the double-action mode and the trigger weight of single-action mode. This allows a more accurate first shot due to the lighter weight of the trigger. It is also safer due to the longer trigger travel required to fire the pistol. A light pull on the trigger causes the hammer to flick back, after which the pistol would behave in conventional single-action mode.
The pistol can also be fired in traditional double and single-action modes.

The factory double-column type box magazines hold 13 or 15 rounds for the full size variant or for the compact variant 10 rounds. Smith & Wesson 59-series magazines are known to be compatible with the DP51 but will protrude slightly. The magazine release is of the push button type.

The pistol has three-dot iron sights. The safety consists of an ambidextrous safety external safety and a passive firing pin block which (as its name implies) blocks the firing pin from moving forward unless the trigger is pulled.

The handgrip panels are made of one piece polymer.

Commercial sales

The K5 was marketed commercially in the United States between the early to late 1990s through various importers, including FirstShot, Inc., Kimber of America, Inc., B-West Imports, Inc., and Davidsons, Inc. as the DP51, with a compact version known as the DP51C and  S&W caliber version known as the DH40.

It was reintroduced to the U.S. market through collaboration between Daewoo (now S&T Motiv) and Lionheart Industries of Redmond, WA in 2011 as the LH9, LH9C, and LH9 MKII (amongst other variants), featuring numerous updates including a redesigned hammer, wider slide serrations with added serrations to the front of the slide, redesigned grips, Cerakote finish, and optional Picatinny rail (as the MKII).

The internal design and basic functions remain identical to the original and all the parts interchange between the original and the Lionheart variants.

A later variant of the pistol was introduced in 2016 by Lionheart called the REGULUS, chambered in 9x19mm Parabellum. The REGULUS was made in the United States, not imported, as was the case with prior models of Lionheart pistols. 

The REGULUS built on the LH9 by adding Novak sight cuts, an accessory rail on the dust cover, and an overall change of the pistol's aesthetic. In 2019 the REGULUS was re-released by Lionheart's new owner when the company moved from Renton, Washington to Winder Georgia. Further refinements were made to the pistol including a redesign of the extractor, redesign of the recoil spring assembly, the addition of G10 grips, and an update to the pistol's finish using Cerekote Elite.

Variants
 XK5: Experimental prototype.
 K5: Standard mass-produced variant.
 DP51: Commercial version of K5.
 DP51S: Semi-compact version with compact slide and full-sized frame.
 DP51C: Compact version of DP51.
 DH40: Commercial version of K5 chambered in  S&W.
 LH9: Updated Version of the DP51 introduced by Lionheart Industries in 2011.
 LH9C: Compact version of the LH9.
 LH9 MKII: LH9 equipped with integral picatinny rail.
REGULUS: Updated version of LH9
REGULUS Alpha: Full size pistol
REGULUS Beta: Compact pistol

Users

: Purchased in 2011. 
: Purchased in 2011.
: Standard sidearm.
: Singapore Armed Forces Commando Formation (CDO FN)
: Macedonia Armed Forces
: 200 K5s transferred according to a 2019 SIPRI small arms report.

References

Bibliography

External links

 S&T Daewoo Homepage
 US Distributor Lionhart Industries Homepage
 Modern Firearms, World Guns, Daewoo DP-51 / K5 pistol (Republic of Korea / South Korea)
 Gun Review: Lionheart LH9 By Nick Leghorn on March 4, 2013
 Gun Review: Lionheart LH9 – Take 2 By Joe Grine on May 31, 2013
 Proper lineage: a review of Lionheart’s LH9 Aaron Cowan April 30, 2014

9mm Parabellum semi-automatic pistols
Post–Cold War weapons of South Korea
Semi-automatic pistols of South Korea